Vyron Brown is an American football coach. He is the head football coach at Lane College in Jackson, Tennessee, a position he has held since February 2020. After the 2020 football season was cancelled, Brown led Lane to a 6–4 season in 2021. 

Brown was a member of the last recruiting class of the legendary Eddie Robinson at Grambling State University. He then played for Grambling coach Doug Williams after Robinson's retirement. Brown played for Grambling from 1997 to 2000 and was a two-time captain.

Head coaching record

College

References

External links
 Lane profile

Year of birth missing (living people)
Living people
Alabama State Hornets football coaches
Lane Dragons football coaches
Grambling State Tigers football coaches
Grambling State Tigers football players
Shaw Bears football coaches
Texas Southern Tigers football coaches
High school football coaches in Louisiana
Coaches of American football from Louisiana
Players of American football from Shreveport, Louisiana
African-American coaches of American football
African-American players of American football